Guyanica is a genus of leaf beetles in the subfamily Eumolpinae.

Species
 Guyanica albomaculata (Allard, 1894)
 Guyanica balyi (Lefèvre, 1877)
 Guyanica bipartita (Marshall, 1865)
 Guyanica circumcincta (Marshall, 1865)
 Guyanica congrua (Weise, 1921
 Guyanica cyanicornis (Lefèvre, 1891)
 Guyanica duodecimpunctata (Jacoby, 1897)
 Guyanica fenestrata Jacoby, 1900
 Guyanica limbata (Olivier, 1808)
 Guyanica octoguttata (Olivier, 1808)
 Guyanica pallida (Olivier, 1808)
 Guyanica picta (Jacoby, 1900)
 Guyanica rectilineata (Marshall, 1865)
 Guyanica rufovittata (Marshall, 1865)
 Guyanica sanguinea (Harold, 1874)
 Guyanica unimaculata (Baly, 1864)
 Guyanica unipunctata (Olivier, 1808)
 Guyanica vicina (Lefèvre, 1891)

Synonyms:
 Eriphylina nigritarsis Lefèvre, 1877: synonym of Guyanica pallida (Olivier, 1808)

References

Eumolpinae
Chrysomelidae genera
Beetles of South America
Taxa named by Louis Alexandre Auguste Chevrolat